Lisa Gardner (born 1972) is a #1 New York Times bestselling American novelist. She is the author of more than 20 suspense novels, published in more than 30 countries. She began her career writing romantic suspense under the pseudonym Alicia Scott, before the publication of her breakout domestic thriller, The Perfect Husband, in 1997. TV and movie credits include At the Midnight House (CBS), Instinct to Kill, The Survivors Club (CBS), and Hide (TNT) as well as personal appearances on TruTV's Murder by the Book and CNN.

Biography
Raised in Hillsboro, Oregon, she graduated from the city's Glencoe High School. Her novel Gone is set in a fictionalized version of Tillamook, Oregon.

In the mid-1990s, she was a research analyst in Boston with Mercer Management (now Oliver Wyman). She credited her long days doing research for giving her the skills needed to follow a line of investigation while learning new topics.

As of 2014, Gardner lives in New England with her family. She is known for her work with animal rescue and at-risk children, receiving the Silver Bullet Award from the International Thriller Writers in 2017 in honor of her efforts.

Bibliography

As Lisa Gardner

Novels 

FBI Profiler, or Quincy & Rainie series:
 The Perfect Husband (1997), 
 The Third Victim (2001), 
 The Next Accident (2001), 
 The Killing Hour (2003), 
 Gone (2006), 
 Say Goodbye (2008), 
 6.5. "The 4th Man" (2016), short story, crossover with Detective D.D. Warren series
 Right Behind You (2017), 
 When You See Me (2020), crossover with Detective D.D. Warren series

Detective D.D. Warren series:
 Alone (2004), 
 Hide (2007), 
 The Neighbor (2009), 
 Live to Tell (2010), 
 Love You More (2011), crossover with Tessa Leoni series
 5.5. "The 7th Month" (2012), short story, 
 Catch Me (2012), 
 Fear Nothing (2014), 
 7.5. "3 Truths and a Lie" (2016), short story, 
 Find Her (2016), 
 8.5. "The 4th Man" (2016), short story, crossover with FBI Profiler series
 Look for Me (2018), 
 9.5. "The Guy Who Died Twice" (2019), short story, 
 Never Tell (2019), 
 When You See Me (2020), crossover with FBI Profiler series

Tessa Leoni series:
 Love You More (2011), crossover with Detective D.D. Warren series
 Touch & Go (2013), 
 Crash & Burn (2015), 

Frankie Elkin series:
 Before She Disappeared (2021), 
 One Step Too Far (2022), 

Stand-alones:
 The Other Daughter (1999), 
 The Survivors Club (2002), 
 I'd Kill For That (2004), with more authors,

Short stories 

 "The 7th Month" (2012), Detective D.D. Warren series
 "3 Truths and a Lie" (2016), Detective D.D. Warren series
 "The 4th Man" (2016), crossover FBI Profiler series and Detective D.D. Warren series
 "The Guy Who Died Twice" (2019), Detective D.D. Warren series

Non-fiction 

 Mom's Other Medicine (2021), guide

As Alicia Scott

Novels 

Walking After Midnight series:
 Walking After Midnight (1992), 
 Shadow's Flame (1994), 

Guiness Gang series:
 At the Midnight Hour (1995), 
 Hiding Jessica (1995), 
 The Quiet One (1996), 
 The One Worth Waiting For (1996), 
 The One Who Almost Got Away (1996), 

Family Secrets, or Maximillian's Children series:
 Maggie's Man (1997), m
 Macnamara's Woman (1997), 
 Brandon's Bride (1998), 

Stand-alones:
 Waking Nightmare (1994), 
 Partners in Crime (1998), 
 Marrying Mike... Again (1999), Men in Blue #13 series

Short stories 

Partners in Crime (36 Hours series #9):
 "Partners in Crime Part 1" (2014), novella
 "Partners in Crime Part 2" (2014), novella
 "Partners in Crime Part 3" (2014), novella

Adaptations 

 At The Midnight Hour (1995), TV movie directed by Charles Jarrott, based on novel At The Midnight Hour
 Instinct to Kill (2001), film directed by Gustavo Graef-Marino, based on novel The Perfect Husband
 The Survivors Club (2004), TV movie directed by Christopher Leitch, based on novel The Survivors Club
 Hide (2011), TV movie directed by John Gray, based on novel Hide

Awards 

 Hardcover Thriller of the Year from the International Thriller Writers for The Neighbor
 Grand Prix des Lectrices de Elle in France, also for The Neighbor
 Daphne du Maurier Award in 2000 for The Other Daughter

References

External links
 
 
 Modern Signed Books BlogTalkRadio Interview with Rodger Nichols about her novel Find Her

1956 births
20th-century American novelists
21st-century American novelists
20th-century American women writers
21st-century American women writers
American crime fiction writers
American thriller writers
American romantic fiction writers
Living people
People from Hillsboro, Oregon
Novelists from New Hampshire
Novelists from Oregon
American women novelists
Women mystery writers
Women thriller writers
Women romantic fiction writers